Andrei Pavel was the defending champion but lost in the quarterfinals to Magnus Gustafsson.

Andrea Gaudenzi won in the final 6–0, 7–5 against Markus Hipfl.

Seeds
A champion seed is indicated in bold text while text in italics indicates the round in which that seed was eliminated.

  Dominik Hrbatý (first round)
  Andrei Pavel (quarterfinals)
  Marcelo Ríos (first round)
  Albert Portas (first round)
  Álex Calatrava (second round)
  Andrew Ilie (first round)
  Michal Tabara (semifinals)
  Magnus Gustafsson (semifinals)

Draw

External links
 2001 International Raiffeisen Grand Prix Draw

Hypo Group Tennis International
2001 ATP Tour